Poor Tom Is Cold is a 2004 made-for-TV film starring Peter Outerbridge, Colm Meaney, Keeley Hawes and Flora Montgomery. The second film to feature the character of William Murdoch and his unique ways of doing detective work, the film is based on the novel by Maureen Jennings of the same name, and was directed by Michael DeCarlo from a screenplay by Janet Maclean.

Plot
Constable Oliver Wicken (Philip Graeme) is found dead, in the basement of an abandoned house, shot through the head.  While the rest of the police department believes he committed suicide, William Murdoch (Peter Outerbridge) thinks otherwise and sets out to prove that his friend and protégé was murdered.

While investigating Wicken's death, Murdoch comes across some interesting facts the late constable had kept hidden. He discovers that Wicken was secretly engaged and had been working closely with a mysterious blond woman before his death.

Murdoch uses new but unproven technique called "fingerprinting", to get fingerprints off the gun.  With the help of Dr. Odgen, Murdoch proves that Wicken was actually murdered and catches the killer.

Cast
 Peter Outerbridge as Detective William Murdoch
 Colm Meaney as Inspector Brackenreid
 Keeley Hawes as Dr. Julia Ogden
 Flora Montgomery as Ettie Weston
 Philip Graeme as Constable Oliver Wickham
 Matthew MacFadzean as Constable George Crabtree
 Chang Tseng as Sam Lee

DVDs
All three Murdoch films were released on DVD in a boxed set on November 11, 2008.
On March 3, 2015, Acorn Media announced a re-release for all three movies, set for May 26, 2015.

References

External links 
 

Canadian drama television films
2004 television films
2004 films
Films set in Toronto
Films based on Canadian novels
English-language Canadian films
Films set in the 1890s
2000s Canadian films